Katie Harnock (born August 12, 1983) is a Canadian 2.0 point Paralympic wheelchair basketball player.

Biography
Katie Harnock was born in Kitchener, Ontario, on August 12, 1983. She attended St. David Catholic Secondary School. She commenced playing wheelchair basketball in 1993, when she was just 10 years old, after she received a local club's brochure in the mail. She joined her local team in Kitchener when she was 13. In 1998 she was named the Junior Female Athlete of the Year by the Ontario Wheelchair Sports Association. She joined the senior national team in 2006, and made her Paralympic debut at the 2008 Summer Paralympic Games in Beijing, where Canada came fifth. In 2012, she participated in the 2012 Summer Paralympic Games in London, where Canada came sixth. She attended the University of Alabama, where she studied English, graduating in 2013.

Harnock was part of the team that won a gold medal at the 2014 Women's World Wheelchair Basketball Championship in Toronto in July 2014, and silver at the 2015 Parapan American Games in August 2015.

Awards
Queen Elizabeth II Diamond Jubilee Medal  (2013)

References

External links
 
 

1983 births
Living people
Paralympic wheelchair basketball players of Canada
Canadian women's wheelchair basketball players
Sportspeople from Kitchener, Ontario
Wheelchair basketball players at the 2008 Summer Paralympics
Wheelchair basketball players at the 2012 Summer Paralympics
Wheelchair basketball players at the 2016 Summer Paralympics